RCA video may refer to any video standards using RCA connectors.
Composite video (the most common standard referred to as "RCA video"
S-Video, some renditions of this standard utilize 2 RCA ports (luma and chroma), of which are only "half" of composite video with provisions for less crosstalk.
Component video, uses three "red" (Pb), "green" (Y) and "blue" (Pr) RCA ports; of which this standard also derives from the composite video standard too.
Selectavision, or Capacitance Electronic Disc; RCA's obscure video format